River Road is an American country music band composed of Tony Ardoin (guitar, vocals), Mike Burch (drums, vocals), Richard Comeaux (steel guitar), Steve Grisaffe (lead vocals, bass guitar), and Charles Ventre (keyboards, vocals). Founded in 1989, the band signed to Capitol Records Nashville in 1997, releasing their self-titled debut album that year and charting three singles on the Billboard country charts, including the top 40 hit "Nickajack". By 1998, River Road had transferred to Virgin Records Nashville, charting a fourth single and recording an unreleased album (Somethin' in the Water). Ventre and Grisaffe each began solo careers in the 2000s, but they reunited with Ardoin and Burch in 2011 to release a new extended play.

History
River Road was formed in 1989 in the state of Louisiana by lead singer and bass guitarist Steve Grisaffe, who had previously played in other bands in Louisiana. Completing the original roster were drummer Eddie Bodin (later replaced by Mike Burch), guitarist/vocalist Tony Ardoin, steel guitarist Richard Comeaux, and keyboardist Charles Ventre. In 1991, the band placed second in a National Marlboro Country Music Contest, in addition to touring throughout their native Louisiana. Eventually, they were signed to Capitol Nashville after considering deals with Almo Sounds and Rising Tide Records.

River Road's first album, also titled River Road, was released in 1997. Overall, this album produced three chart singles on the Hot Country Songs charts: "I Broke It, I'll Fix It", "Nickajack" (which entered Top 40), and "Somebody Will". The album was co-produced by Scott Hendricks and Gary Nicholson. Billboard gave "Nickajack" a positive review, saying that it was "crisp and radio-friendly" and "could be the single that helps set this new quintet apart."

When Virgin Records opened its Nashville, Tennessee, division in 1998, River Road was transferred to Virgin Nashville, becoming one of the first three acts signed to that division (the other two being singer Julie Reeves and prank caller Roy D. Mercer). While on Virgin, the band began work on its second studio album (2000's Something in the Water), with its lead-off single "Breathless" charting as well. Virgin Nashville was dissolved by the end of the year, and Somethin' in the Water was never released, although the title track would become a Top 40 hit for its writer, Jeffrey Steele, when he recorded it a year later.

By the end of the year, River Road had disbanded, with both Ventre and Grisaffe pursuing solo careers. Grisaffe released an album titled Current Status in 2001 on an independent label. Ardoin, Burch, Grisaffe, and Ventre reunited in 2011 to release an extended play on the Star Records label.

River Road (1997)

Track listing

Personnel
As listed in liner notes.

River Road
Tony Ardoin – electric guitar, background vocals
Mike Burch – drums, background vocals
Richard Comeaux – pedal steel guitar
Steve Grisaffe – bass guitar, lead vocals
Charles Ventre – keyboards, background vocals

Additional musicians
Bruce Bouton – lap steel guitar
J. T. Corenflos – electric guitar
Chad Cromwell – drums
Larry Franklin – fiddle
Paul Franklin – pedal steel guitar
Bob Glaub – bass guitar
Mike Henderson – electric guitar
Dann Huff – electric guitar
John Jorgenson – electric guitar, acoustic guitar, mandolin
Steve Nathan – piano, Hammond organ, strings
Michael Spriggs – acoustic guitar

Singles

Music videos

References

External links
Charles Ventre official website
River Road  official website

Country music groups from Louisiana
Musical groups established in 1989
Capitol Records artists
Virgin Records artists